Vasiliki Papazoglou (born ) is a Greek female volleyball player. She was part of the Greece women's national volleyball team.

She competed with the national team at the 2004 Summer Olympics in Athens, Greece. She played with Panellinios in 2004.

Clubs
  Panellinios (2004)

See also
 Greece at the 2004 Summer Olympics

References

External links
www.cev.lu
Sports Reference
todor66.com

1979 births
Living people
Greek women's volleyball players
Place of birth missing (living people)
Volleyball players at the 2004 Summer Olympics
Olympic volleyball players of Greece
21st-century Greek women